Southern Natural Gas Company, headquartered in Birmingham, Alabama, is a natural gas pipeline company that was founded in 1928 and is currently a division of Kinder Morgan. The company was a division of Birmingham-based Sonat Inc. until 1999 when Sonat and El Paso Corporation merged. El Paso was acquired by Kinder Morgan in 2012.

Description
Southern Natural Gas (SNG) is an approximately 6,900-mile pipeline system extending from natural gas supply basins in Louisiana, Mississippi and Alabama, to market areas in Louisiana, Mississippi, Alabama, Florida, Georgia, South Carolina and Tennessee, including the metropolitan areas of Atlanta and Birmingham.

Service Areas
SNG is a principal natural gas transporter to southeastern markets in Alabama, Georgia and South Carolina, which are some of the fastest growing natural gas demand regions in the United States. The SNG system is also connected to Southern LNG's Elba Island LNG terminal near Savannah, Georgia.

See also
 Sonat Inc.
 El Paso Corporation
 Kinder Morgan

References

External links
Southern Natural Gas website

Natural gas companies of the United States
Kinder Morgan
Defunct companies based in Alabama
Companies based in Birmingham, Alabama
Energy in Alabama
Non-renewable resource companies established in 1928
1928 establishments in Alabama